Pimelodendron is a plant genus in the family Euphorbiaceae first described as a genus in 1855. It is native to insular Southeast Asia, Thailand, Papuasia, and Queensland.

These are small and large trees, with red to brown bark. The tree has white or yellow, spotty exudate and also contains some latex. The leaves are in general tightly bunched at the end of twigs.

Species
 Pimelodendron amboinicum Hassk. - Lesser Sunda Is, Sulawesi, Maluku, New Guinea, Bismarks, Solomons, Queensland
 Pimelodendron griffithianum  (Müll.Arg.) Benth. ex Hook.f. - S Thailand, W Malaysia, Borneo, Sumatra
 Pimelodendron macrocarpum J.J.Sm. - W Malaysia, Borneo, Sumatra
 Pimelodendron zoanthogyne J.J.Sm. - W Malaysia, Borneo, Sumatra

Formerly included
moved to Actephila 
Pimelodendron dispersum - Actephila excelsa var. javanica

References

 
Euphorbiaceae genera